A bakehouse is a building for baking bread. The term may be used interchangeably with the term "bakery", although the latter commonly includes both production and retail areas.

Designated bakehouses can be found in archaeological sites from ancient times, e.g., in Roman forts.

Historically there have been many types of bakehouses: individual, in the backyards of homesteads; communal, used by residents of a village or a town, and commercial.

Some of them used to be nothing but a huge oven, called oven-houses.

Gallery

See also
 List of baked goods
 Tandoor
 Communal oven

References

Buildings and structures by type
Baking